Robert Edwin Olds (October 22, 1875 - November 25, 1932) was an American diplomat and lawyer who served as the United States Under Secretary of State from 1927 to 1928.

Biography

Robert E. Olds was born in Duluth, Minnesota, on October 22, 1875. After graduating from Harvard Law School in 1900, he practiced law at Saint Paul, Minnesota for 17 years where he was a law partner of Frank B. Kellogg. He served as the Commissioner of the American Red Cross in Europe, from 1919 to 1921 during the war and as a United States member of the League of Nations tribunals and commissions. On 17 June 1925, he was appointed as Assistant Secretary of State by President Calvin Coolidge. He was subsequently appointed as Under Secretary of State, on May 19, 1927.

Olds resigned as Under Secretary of State on 30 June 1928. In 1929 he became a member of the reparations commission under the treaty of Versailles. He was appointed as a member of the permanent court of arbitration at the Hague in 1931. He died suddenly on November 25, 1932 in Paris, where he was a member of the council of the International Chamber of Commerce, due to a cerebral hemorrhage.

Works

References

1875 births
1932 deaths
Minnesota lawyers
League of Nations people
Politicians from Duluth, Minnesota
United States Under Secretaries of State
Harvard Law School alumni